Northwick Park is a London Underground station in Kenton in the London Borough of Brent on the Metropolitan line. It lies between Harrow-on-the-Hill and Preston Road stations and is in Travelcard zone 4.

It is served by 'slow' (all stations) trains only (fast and semi-fast trains do not stop at stations between Wembley Park and Harrow-on-the-Hill). It takes an average time of 20 minutes from Baker Street. The station takes its name from the nearby public park, Northwick Park.

It is close to Northwick Park Hospital and the Harrow campus of the University of Westminster. Kenton station, located on the Bakerloo line and the London Overground, is within walking distance. There is an official out-of-station interchange between these two stations.

Services 
The off-peak service in trains per hour (tph) is:
 2tph Northbound to Amersham (all stations)
 2tph Northbound to Chesham (all stations)
 8tph Northbound to Uxbridge (all stations)
 4tph Northbound to Watford (all stations)
 4tph Southbound to Baker Street (all stations)
 12tph Southbound to Aldgate via Baker Street (all stations)

The peak time service in trains per hour (tph) is:
 2tph Northbound (morning peak only) to Amersham (all stations)
 2tph Northbound (morning peak only) to Chesham (all stations)
 10tph Northbound to Uxbridge (all stations)
 4tph Southbound to Baker Street (all stations)
 12tph Southbound to Aldgate via Baker Street (all stations)
Note that during evening peaks, services to Amersham or Chesham from Northwick Park or Preston Road require a change at Harrow-On-The-Hill.

During the morning peak (06:30 to 09:30), fast services from Amersham and Chesham run non-stop southbound only between Moor Park, Harrow-On-The-Hill and Finchley Road whilst semi-fast services from Watford and Uxbridge run non-stop southbound only between Harrow-On-The-Hill and Finchley Road. During the evening peak (16:30-19:30), fast and semi-fast services, which operate northbound only, call additionally at Wembley Park.

Connections
London Buses routes H18 and H19 serve the station.

References

Gallery

External links

 

Metropolitan line stations
Tube stations in the London Borough of Brent
Former Metropolitan Railway stations
Railway stations in Great Britain opened in 1923
1923 establishments in England